Travis Cottrell is an American contemporary Christian music (CCM) artist, songwriter, author, and worship leader.

Biography 

Cottrell was raised in Boone, North Carolina. In 1990, he moved to Nashville to study at Belmont University. After graduating in 1992 with a degree in music Cottrell dedicated time to songwriting. In the same year he wrote Larnelle Harris' song "It's Only Thunder". He worked with Kathie Hill on a musical titled Waiters: A Youth Musical About Waiting on the Lord. Cottrell has since continued writing songs and working as an editor at a music publishing company.

In 1994, the church Cottrell attended - Two Rivers Baptist Church - lost its minister of worship and at the church's request, Cottrell was the worship leader for the next year and a half. Cottrell has said: "The opportunity of leading worship at Two Rivers Baptist Church that Dr. Jerry Sutton gave me was a blessing." Since that time Cottrell's vocals have been on several praise and worship albums led by Don Moen. He has also led worship at Beth Moore's conferences titled Living Proof Live since 1998.

Since 2002 he has also released several solo albums of praise and worship earning several nominations for Dove Awards. He has continued to write songs and provide background vocals for other artists including Amy Grant, Alan Jackson, and Garth Brooks. In 2010, Travis moved to Jackson, Tennessee to be the music minister at Englewood Baptist Church. On July 4, 2020 Travis became the worship leader at Brentwood Baptist Church in Brentwood, Tennessee.

Discography

Solo albums 
 The Deep (2001)
 Unashamed Love (2003)
 Alive Forever (2005)
 Found (2006)
 Ring the Bells (2008)  (Christmas album)
 Jesus Saves Live (2010)  (live album)
 When the Stars Burn Down (2011)
 I'm Living Proof (2014)
 All That Is Within Me (2016)
 The Reason (2018)

Collaborations and vocals 
 Don Moen - Mighty Cross (1994)
 Don Moen - Emmanuel Has Come (1996)
 Beth Moore - Living Proof Live 2 (2000)
 Don Moen - God in Us (2001)
 Don Moen - Thank You Lord (2004)
 MercyMe - Coming Up to Breathe (2006)
 Various - iWorship/Connect: Live Your Worship (2009)
 Various - iWorship Hymns: The Essential Collection (2009)
 Max Lucado - Fearless Worship (2009)
 Various -  Pressing On: Songs inspired by the Journeys of Paul (2009)

Publications

Awards and recognition 

In 2010, Cottrell received four Dove Awards nominations for his album Jesus Saves Live:

References

External links 
 

Living people
Christian music songwriters
Year of birth missing (living people)